The country of Trinidad and Tobago has a high literacy rate, thanks in part to public education being free from ages 5 to 18 and compulsory from the ages of five to sixteen.  In addition to public education, there are many faith-based schools and other educational institutions that are either partially funded and thus charge some tuition, or are fully tuition-based.

This List of schools in Trinidad and Tobago includes government, assisted and private schools that provide nationally recognized primary and secondary programs.

Primary schools

Assisted schools

Run by Kabir Panth Board

 Agostini Settlement KPA School
 Siparia Road KPA School

Run by the Anglican Board

 Anstey Memorial Girls' Anglican School, San Fernando
 Arouca Anglican Primary School, Arouca
 Barataria Anglican Primary School, Barataria
 Brighton Anglican School, La Breacoll
 Cedros Anglican Primary School, Cedros
 Coffee Boys' Anglican School, San Fernando
 Claxton Bay Junior Anglican School, Claxton Bay
 Claxton Bay Senior Anglican School, Claxton Bay
 Couva Anglican School, Couva,
 Cumana Anglican School, Cumana Village, Toco
 Eckel Village Anglican School, Williamsville
 Forest Reserve Anglican School, Forest Fyzabad
 Good Shepard Anglican Primary School, Tunapuna
 Grande Riviere Anglican School, Grande Riviere Village, via Toco
 Holy Saviour Curepe Anglican, Curepe
 Hope Anglican School, Hope, Tobago 
 Lambeau Anglican School, Lambeau
 Marabella Boys' Anglican School, Marabella
 Marabella Girls' Anglican School Marabella
 Melville Memorial Girls' Anglican School, Belmont
 Morvant Anglican School, Morvant
 Pembroke Anglican School, Port of Spain
 Point Fortin Anglican School Point Fortin
 Richmond Street Boys' Anglican School (Christus Rex), Port-of-Spain
 San Fernando Girls' Anglican School, San Fernando
 Southern Central Anglican School, Cedros
 St. Christopher's Anglican School, Siparia 
 St. Francis boys Roman Catholic
 St Michael's Anglican School, Princes Town
 St John's Anglican Primary School, Cipero Road, San Fernando
 St. Nicholas Private Primary, Tobago
 St. Margaret's Boys' School, Belmont
 St. Patrick's Anglican, Mt. Pleasant Tobago
 Sisters Road Anglican School
 St. Paul's Anglican School, San Fernando
 St. Paul's Anglican School, Roxborough, Tobago 
 St. Stephen's Anglican School, Princes Town
 St. Ursula's Girls Anglican School, St Vincent street POS
 St. Agnes Anglican School, St. James
 St. Mary's Anglican School, Tacarigua
 St. Catherine Girls' Anglican School Duke Street, POS
 Tableland Anglican (St. Nicholas)
 Toco Anglican, Toco Village, Toco

Run by the ASJA Islamic Board

 ASJA Primary School, Barrackpore
 ASJA Primary School, San Fernando
 ASJA Primary School, Rio Claro
 ASJA Primary School, Point Fortin
 ASJA Primary School, Charlieville
 ASJA Primary School, Carapichaima
 ASJA Primary School, Princes Town

Run by the TML Islamic Board

 TML Primary School San Fernando
 TML Primary School St. Joseph
 TML Primary School Libertville

Run by the Presbyterian Board

 Arima Presbyterian School, Arima
 Biche Presbyterian School
 Bien Venue Presbyterian School, [La Romaine]
 Balmain Presbyterian School, Couva
 Bamboo Grove Presbyterian School
 Brothers Presbyterian School, Williamsville
 Bonne Aventure Presbyterian School, Gasparillo
 Canaan Presbyterian School, Duncan Village, San Fernando
 Charlieville Presbyterian School
 Curepe Presbyterian School, Curepe
 Esperanza Presbyterian School, Couva
 Elswick Presbyterian Primary School, Tableland
 Erin Road Presbyterian School
 Exchange Presbyterian School, Couva
 Freeport Presbyterian School
 Fyzabad Presbyterian School
 Grant Memorial Presbyterian School, San Fernando
 Grosvenor Presbyterian School, Sangre Grande
 Inverness Presbyterian School
 Jordan Hill Presbyterian School
 Jubilee Presbyterian School, Guaico Tamana
 Kanhai Presbyterian School
 Lengua Presbyterian School
 McBean Presbyterian School, Couva
 Navet Presbyterian School
 Penal Presbyterian School
 Picton Presbyterian School
 Reform Presbyterian School
 Rochard Douglas Presbyterian School (Barrackpore)
 Rousillac Presbyterian School
 Rio Claro Presbyterian School, Rio Claro
 Saint Julian Presbyterian School
 Sangre Chiquito Presbyterian School
 San Juan Presbyterian School, San Juan
 Santa Cruz Presbyterian School
 Siparia Road Presbyterian School
 Siparia Union Presbyterian School
 Tabaquite Presbyterian School, Tabaquite
 Tunapuna Presbyterian School
 Union Presbyterian School

Run by the Roman Catholic Board

 Arima Boys' RC School
 Arima Girls' RC School
 Belmont Boys' RC School
 Belmont Girls' RC School
 Biche RC School, New Lands Village, Biche
 Boissiere R.C. School
 Bourg Mulatresse RC School, Santa Cruz
 Brazil RC School
 Carenage Boys R.C
 Caratal Sacred Heart R.C. School
 Chaguanas RC School
 Carapichaima R.C. School
 Chickland RC School Chickland
 Cunapo (St. Francis) RC School, Sangre Grande
 Cumana RC School, Cumana Village, Toco
 Delaford R.C.School (Tobago)
 Erin RC School
 Exchange RC School Couva
 Flanagin Town RC School Flanagin Town
 Granville RC School, Cedros
 Guayaguayare RC School, Guayaguare
 La Brea RC School
 La Fillette RC School
 Lochmaben RC School, Cedros
 Malick Girls' RC School
 Maraval RC School
 La Lune RC School
 Maria Regina Grade School
 Matelot RC School, Matelot Village, via Toco
 Mayaro (St. Thomas) RC School, Radix Village, Mayaro
 Mayo R.C. School
 Mon Repo RC School
 Mount Russia
 Mucurapo Boys' RC School
 Nelson Street Girls' RC School, Port of Spain
 Nelson Street Boys' RC School, Port of Spain
 Newtown Boys' RC School
 Newtown Girls' RC School
 North Oropouche R.C School, Toco Main Rd
 Ortoire RC School, Ortoire Village, Mayaro
 Paramin RC School
 Petit Valley Boys' R.C School
 Petit Valley Girls' R.C School
 Point Fortin RC School
 Point Cumana RC School
 Poole RC School, Rio Claro
 Princes Town RC School
 Rosary Boys' RC School
 Rampanalgas RC School, Rampanalgas Village, Balandra
 Rose hill rc school
 Scarborough R.C. School (Tobago)
 St. Dominic's RC School
 South Oropouche RC School
 St. Joseph Boys' RC School
 St. Joseph Girls' RC School
 St. Finbar Girls' RC School, Arouca
 St. Gabriel's Girls' RC School
 St. Mary's Mucurapo Girls' RC School
 St. Pius Boys' RC School, Arouca
 St. Rose's Girls' RC School
 St. Benedict's La Romaine RC School
 St. Theresa's Girls RC School
 St Therese RC School, Rio Claro 
 Sacred Heart Girls' RC School
 San Fernando Boys' RC School
 Santa Cruz R.C. School
 The Siparia Boys' R.C. School, Siparia
 Tabaquite RC School
 Toco RC School, Mission Village, Toco
 Todds Road RC School Todds Road
 Tunapuna Boys' RC School
 Tunapuna Girls' RC School
 Upper Guaico RC School, Nestor Village, Guaico Tamana Rd.
 San Juan Boys' RC School
 San Juan Girls RC School
 San Souci RC School, San Souci Village, via Toco
 St. Brigid's Girls R.C School
 Success R.C.School, Laventile
 Vance River RC School

Hindu School
 Debe Hindu School 
 Sangre Grande Hindu School
 El Socorro Hindu School
 El Dorado North Hindu School
 El Dorado South Hindu School
 Orange Field Hindu School
 Rio Claro Hindu School, Rio Claro
 McBean Hindu School, Couva
 Ramai Trace Hindu School (The Dr. Roodal Moonilal Ramai Trace S.D.M.S. Primary School), Ramai Trace Debe 
 Riverside* Hindu School
 Robert Village Hindu School
 Spring Village Hindu School
 Freeport Hindu School
 Felicity Hindu School
 Munroe Road Hindu School
 Reform Hindu School

Government schools
 Arima Boys' Government Primary School, Arima
 Arima Girls' Government Primary School, Arima
 Arima New Government Primary School
Bon Accord Government Primary School
 Brasso Venado Government Primary School
 Belmont Government primary school 
 Castara Government Primary School, Castara
 Cedros Government Primary School, Cedros
 Chatham Government Primary School, Cedros
 Clarke Rochard Government Penal
 Cocoyea Government, Cocoyea Village, San Fernando
 Couva South Government Primary School
 Crystal Stream Government
 Cunjal Government, Barrackpore
 Cunupia Government Primary School 
 D'Abadie Government Primary School, D'Abadie
 DesVignes Road Government Primary School, Runemede, Moriah
 Diamond Vale Government Primary, Diego Martin
 Diego Martin Government Primary School
 Dinsley Trincity Government Primary School
 Dow Village Government Primary School
 Guaico Government Primary, Guaico Village, Sangre Grande
 Egypt Village Government Primary School, Point Fortin
 El Socorro North Government Primary School
 Fanny Village Government Primary School, Point Fortin
 Icacos Government Primary School, Cedros
 Jerningham Government Primary School [Cunupia]
 La Horquetta North Government Primary School
 La Horquetta South Government Primary School
 Macaulay Government Primary School, Macaulay, Claxton Bay
 Mafeking Government Primary School, Mafeking Village, Mayaro
 Malabar Government Primary School, Malabar, Arima
 Maloney Government Primary School, Maloney
 Matura Government Primary School, Matura Village
 Mayaro Government Primary School, Mayaro
 Montgomery Government
 Monkey Town Government Primary School, Barrackpore
 Monte Video Government Primary, Monte Video Village, via Toco
 Mount Pleasant Government School, Solidad Rd, Claxton Bay
 Moriah Government Primary School
 North Oropouche Government Primary School
 Raghunanan Road Government Primary School
 Tortuga Government Primary School
 Tranquility Government Primary School
 Vos Government Primary School, Gasparillo
Gasparillo Government Primary School,Gasparillo

Private schools 
 Ambassador College Private School
 Apex International Academy, Chaguanas, Trinidad
 Arbor, Maraval 
 Christian Primary Academy, Arouca
 Beach Camp Community School, Palo Seco
 Bishop Anstey Junior, Port of Spain
 Blackman's Private School, Maraval, Port of Spain
 Briggs Preparatory School
 Bryn Mawr Private School, Petite Valley
 Cedar Grove Private Primary School, Palmiste, San Fernando
 Elders' Classes, Port of Spain
 Eniath's Montessori and Prep School, Lange Park, Chaguanas
 Explorers Childcare Academy ( Lange Park, Chaguanas)
 Holy Rosary Preparatory, St. James
 Personal Tutoring Institute, Arima
 Precious Little Angels, Port of Spain
 Savonetta Private School, San Fernando
 The Giuseppi Preparatory School, Arima
 Leviticus Academy (Arima, Trinidad)
 Lucia's Private School, Saint Augustine, Trinidad and Tobago
 Nova Satus Private School, Cunupia
 Holy Faith Preparatory, Port of Spain
 Holy Name Preparatory, Port of Spain
 Marabella Learning Centre
 St. Peter's Private Primary School, Pointe-à-Pierre
 St. Martin's Girls High School, Belmont
 International School of Port of Spain 
 SuJo's Private School, Woodbrook
 Specialist Learning Center 
 Christian Primary Academy, Trinidad
 Regulus Educational Academy Chaguanas
 Scholars Private Primary and Pre School (Tacarigua)
 Scholastic Academy, St. Augustine 
 St. Andrew's Private School, Maraval
 St. Joseph Terrace Private School, San Fernando
 St. Xavier's Private School, St. Joseph
 St. Monica's Preparatory, Port of Spain
 St. Catherine's Private School, Woodbrook
 Student Remediation Centre, Marabella, San Fernando
 Study Zone Institute, Barataria
 The Trinidad Renaissance School, San Fernando
 The University School, St. Augustine
 Tobago International Academy (Tobago)
 Waterman's Preparatory School, La Romain
 Maria Regina Grade School
 Dunross Preparatory School
 Open Bible High School, San Fernando
 Athenias Presecondary School St Augustine
 Sevilla Private Primary School, Sevilla Compound, Rivulet Road, Brechin Castle, Couva
 Scholars Private Primary and Pre-School, Tacarigua.
 Mayaro Guayaguayare Community School
 St. Hilary's Preparatory School
 Windermere Private School

Secondary schools

List of secondary schools in Trinidad and Tobago

Run by the Anglican Board
 Bishop Anstey High School East, Trincity
 Bishop Anstey High School, Port of Spain
 Bishop Centenary College, Port of Spain
 Bishop's High School, Tobago
 Fyzabad Anglican Secondary School 
 St. Stephen's College, Princes Town
 Trinity College, Moka, Maraval
 Trinity College East, Trincity

Royal College of Trinidad (Government/Self-Funded) 
Queen's Royal College

Run by the Baptist Board
 Cowen Hamilton Secondary School, Moruga

Run by the Anjuman Sunnat-ul-Jamaat Association Board
 ASJA Boys' College, San Fernando
 ASJA Girls' College, San Fernando
 ASJA Boys' College, Charlieville
 ASJA Girls' College, Charlieville
 ASJA Girls' College, Tunapuna
 ASJA Girls' College, Barrackpore

Run by the Presbyterian Board
 Hillview College, Tunapuna
 Iere High School, Siparia
 Naparima College, San Fernando
 Naparima Girls' High School, San Fernando
 Saint Augustine Girls' High School, Saint Augustine

Run by the Roman Catholic Board
 Providence Girls' Catholic (Belmont Circular)
 Holy Cross College, Calvary Hill, Arima
 Holy Faith Convent, Couva
 Holy Faith Convent, Penal
 Fatima College, Port of Spain
 Holy Name Convent, Port of Spain
 Holy Name Convent, Point Fortin
 Presentation College, Chaguanas
 Presentation College, San Fernando
 St. Andrew's Academy, Chaguanas
 St. Anthony's College, Westmoorings
 St. Benedict's College, La Romaine, San Fernando
 St. Francis College, Port of Spain
 St. Joseph's Convent, Port of Spain
 St. Joseph's Convent, St. Joseph
 St. Joseph's Convent, San Fernando
 St. Joseph's Convent, Tobago
 St. Mary's College, Port of Spain
 Corpus Christi College, Diego Martin
 St. Joseph's College, St. Joseph

Run by the Seventh-day Adventist Board
 Harmon School of S.D.A. (Tobago)
 Southern Academy of SDA (San Fernando )
 Bates Memorial High School (Sangre Grande)
 Caribbean Union College Secondary School (Maracas, St. Joseph)

Run by the Sanatan Dharma Maha Sabha Hindu Board
 Lakshmi Girls' Hindu College, St Augustine
 Vishnu Boys' Hindu College, Caroni
 Saraswati Girls' Hindu College, Chaguanas
 Shiva Boys' Hindu College, Penal
 Parvati Girls' Hindu College, Debe

Run by the SWAHA  Board
 SWAHA Hindu College

Other assisted
 Johnson's Finishing School
 Miracle Ministries Pentecostal High School, Mc Bean, Couva
 Pentecostal Light and Life Foundation High School.

Government Secondary Schools

 Aranguez North Secondary School
 Arima Central Secondary School
 Arima North Secondary School
 Barataria North Secondary School 
 Barataria South Secondary School
 Barrackpore West Secondary School
 Barrackpore East Secondary School
 Belmont Secondary School
 Biche Secondary School
 Bon Air Secondary School
 Blanchisseuse High School 
 Brazil Secondary School
 Carapichaima East secondary school
 Carapichaima West secondary school
 Cedros Secondary School
 Chaguanas South Secondary School
 Chaguanas North Secondary School
 Coryal Secondary School School
 Couva East Secondary School
 Couva West Secondary School
 Debe Secondary School
 Diego Martin Central Secondary School
 Diego Martin North Secondary School
 El Dorado East Secondary School
 El Dorado West Secondary School
 Five Rivers Government Secondary School
 Fyzabad Secondary School 
 Gasparillo Secondary School
 Goodwood Secondary School
 Guaico Secondary School, Guaico 
 Guayaguayare Secondary School
 Malick Secondary School
 Marabella North Secondary School
 Marabella Junior Secondary School
 Mason Hall Secondary School
 Mayaro Secondary School 
 Mt. Hope Secondary School
 Morvant Laventille Secondary School
 Northeastern College
 Palo Seco Government Secondary School
 Pleasantville Senior Comprehensive School, San Fernando
 Point Fortin East Secondary School
 Point Fortin West Secondary School
 Preysal Secondary School, Couva
 Rio Claro College
 Rio Claro High School
 Roxborough Secondary School
 San Fernando Central Secondary School
 San Fernando East Secondary School
 San Fernando West Secondary School
 Sangre Grande Secondary School 
 San Juan North Secondary School 
 San Juan South Secondary School
 Scarborough Secondary School 
 Signal Hill Secondary School 
 Siparia East Secondary School
 Siparia West Secondary School
 South East Port-of-Spain Secondary School
 Speyside High School
 St. Augustine Secondary School
 St. Francois Girls College, Belmont
 St. George's College, Barataria
 St. Joseph Secondary School
 St. James Secondary School
 Success Laventille Composite School
 Tabaquite Secondary School
 Toco Secondary School
 Tranquility Government Secondary School
 Tunapuna Secondary School
 Vessigny [Antilles] Government Secondary School, La Brea
 Waterloo Secondary School
 Woodbrook Government Secondary School
 Valencia Secondary School

Private schools
 Young Achievers Academy (Online Secondary School)
 Apex International Academy, Chaguanas,Trinidad
 Personal Tutoring Institute, Arima + Online
 Adonis Academy, Arima,Trinidad 
 Study Zone Institute Ltd, EMR, Barataria, Trinidad
Grade A Tutoring and Learning Centre , #75 Third Avenue,Barataria
 Professional Institute of Marketing and Business Studies Ltd. /Our Lady of Fatima High School
 Harmon School of SDA Secondary, Scarborough, Tobago.
 International School of Port of Spain
Ms. Loutoo's Private Tuition (Online Private Tuition Centre, evening classes)
 Trillium International School, Chaguanas (based on the Canadian curriculum)
 Elders' Classes, Port of Spain
 Maple Leaf International School (based on the Canadian curriculum)
 St. Augustine Community College
 The British Academy Limited (UK Curriculum, CIE registered)
 Bishop's Centenary College
 St. Charles'Convent 
 Royal Academy, Tunapuna
 Bishop Anstey High School East
 Trinity College East
 Chinmaya Vidyalaya
 Darul Uloom
 Forde College
 Upper level
 NorthGate College, St. Augustine
 Caribbean Union College Secondary School, Maracas St. Joseph 
 Bates Memorial High School of SDA, Sangre Grande
Sangre Grande Educational Institute 
 Southern Academy of SDA, San Fernando 
 Scholars Private Primary School, Champ Fleurs
 Sobion Tutoring Service, San Juan
 ACE Academy, Siparia
 Pentecostal Light and Life Foundation High School
 Corpus Christi College(Diego Martin)
 Western Educational Institute

See also
 List of Trinidad and Tobago special schools
 List of universities in Trinidad and Tobago
 Education in Trinidad and Tobago

References

External links
 Roman Catholic secondary schools

 
Trinidad and Tobago
Schools
Schools
Trinidad and Tobago
Schools